The Members' Expenses Committee, until July 2011 called the Members' Allowances Committee, was a select committee of the British House of Commons, the lower house of the United Kingdom Parliament. The committee advises the Members Estimates Committee and the Leader of the House of Commons on any potential developments in the allowances system for members of the Commons.

The committee was established on 22 January 2009 as one of several motions put forward by the government attempting to deal with the issue of MPs' expenses which were due to be released under the Freedom of Information Act 2000. The committee was also asked to propose an interim system of expenses and allowances for MPs shortly after the MPs' expenses scandal broke in May 2009.

The Independent Parliamentary Standards Authority (IPSA) was created in answer to the expenses scandal, and the Speaker's Committee on IPSA to oversee it. As a result, the committee lay dormant from the May 2011 general election until July 2011. The committee was renamed, with the expectation of new members being appointed, amid marked dissatisfaction with the expenses scheme developed by IPSA. Its task was to report back to the House on the operations of the Parliamentary Standards Act 2009 (which established IPSA) with due consideration to the following:
 value for money for taxpayers
 accountability
 public confidence in Parliament
 the ability of members to fulfill their duties effectively
 fairness for less well-off members and those with families
 whether members are deterred from submitting legitimate claims

Membership
As of 18 July 2011, the members of the committee are as follows:

Source: Members' Expenses Committee

References

External links
Records for this Committee are held at the Parliamentary Archives

See also
Parliamentary committees of the United Kingdom

Select Committees of the British House of Commons